Somdet Chao Phraya Borom Maha Prayurawongse (1788 - 26 April 1855) or Dit Bunnag was a prominent political figure of Siam during the mid-19th century as a regent for King Mongkut kingdom-wide. He became a Somdet Chao Phraya — the highest rank a Siamese noble had attained during the Rattanakosin Era, with honor equal to that of royalty. He was known colloquially as Somdet Chao Phraya Ong Yai. He was also known as Chao Phraya Phraklang, or Minister of Trade, and dominated Western affairs of Siam during the reign of King Rama III. He held the post of Samuha Kalahom, the Prime Minister of Southern Siam, from 1830 to 1855.

Life
Dit Bunnag was born in 1788 to Bunnag and Chao Kun Nuan (who was Queen Amarindra's sister) at his father's residence off the southern side of the Grand Palace Wall near modern Wat Pho. His father, Bunnag, or Chao Phraya Akkamahasena, had served as Samuha Kalahom the Prime Minister of Southern Siam during the reign of King Phutthayotfa Chulalok. Dit had an younger brother That who later became Somdet Chao Phraya Phichaiyat. Prayurawongse was a member of Bunnag family who descended from Sheikh Ahmad, a Persian minister during the reign of King Prasat Thong (His lineage had converted to Theravada Buddhism in mid-eighteenth century.).

Dit entered the palace as one of the royal pages - the traditional way to Siamese bureaucracy. He rose through ranks as one of the royal pages of King Phutthaloetla Naphalai. In 1818, the Grand Palace expanded south and the Bunnags moved to new residence on the West bank of Chao Phraya River in the Kudi Chin district. In 1819, Carlos Manoel de Silveira, Portuguese delegate from Macau, arrived in Bangkok and established first Western contact of Rattakosin period. Dit was in charge of the receiving Portuguese envoys.

Sultan Ahmad Tajuddin Halim Shah II of Kedah turned against Siamese domination culminating in Siamese invasion of Kedah in 1821. Siamese forces took Alor Setar and Siam took direct control over Kedah. The British on the island of Penang, which had been leased by Kedah to the British in 1786, suspected the Siamese invasion of Penang. Marquess of Hastings, the Governor-General of India, sent John Crawfurd to Bangkok in April 1821. Dit was assigned to deal with Crawfurd mission. Dit gave a place near  his home in Thonburi for Crawfurd to reside. After the Crawfurd mission, Dit was made Chao Phraya Phraklang the Minister of Trade.

In November 1825, Henry Burney arrived in Bangkok. Phraklang was one of three Siamese delegates who took part in the conclusion of Burney Treaty in June 1826.

In 1828, Phraklang commissioned the construction of Wat Prayurawongse in the Kudi Chin district. In 1830, King Rama III proposed to elevate Phraklang to the post of Samuha Kalahom. Phraklang refused, saying that the holder of the title of Chao Phraya Mahasena usually "passed away prematurely". King Rama III then assigned the post of Samuha Kalahom to Phraklang without officially investing him with the title. Phraklang then became responsible in both Kalahom (Southern Siam) and the Kromma Tha Ministry of Trade.

In 1831, Tunku Kudin, nephew of Sultan Ahmad Tajuddin Halim Shah II, staged a revolt in Kedah, took control of Alor Setar and was joined by Patani. King Rama III assigned Phraklang to put down rebellions in Kedah and Patani. Both sultans of Kelantan and Terengganu sent forces to support Patani. Phraklang arrived at Songkhla in March 1832 and Chao Phraya Nakhon Noi the governor of Ligor had already taken Alor Setar so Phraklang went on to take Patani. Tuan Sulung the governor of Pattani fled to Kelantan. When Phraklang had pursued Tuan Sulung to Kelantan, Sultan Muhammad I of Kelantan, who was a relative of Tuan Sulung, surrendered and gave Tuan Sulung to Siamese authority.

Edmund Roberts led an American mission to Bangkok in March 1833. Roberts handed the letters of President Andrew Jackson to Phraklang and took residence in Phraklang's estate in Thonburi. This led to the conclusion of Siamese–American Treaty of Amity and Commerce in April.

During the Siamese-Vietnamese Wars, in 1833, Phraklang led the Siamese fleet with the aim to attack Saigon. Phraklang quickly took Hà Tiên and proceeded through Vĩnh Tế Canal to take Châu Đốc. Phraklang was joined at Châu Đốc by Chao Phraya Bodindecha who led land armies. Both Phraklang and Bodindecha marched along the Bassac River towards Saigon and met Vietnamese fleet at Vàm Nao. During the battle of Vàm Nao, the Siamese fleet refused to engage with Vietnamese vessels, even though Phraklang himself had personally boarded a small boat to urge his fleet to attack. Phraklang and the Siamese fleet retreated to Châu Đốc, Hà Tiên and eventually to Chantaburi.

In March 1847, the Teochew societies, known as Tōa Hia, of Samut Sakhon rose in rebellion and kill one of the royal guards. Phraklang and his son Kham marched royal guard regiment to subjugate the Chinese at Samut Sakhon. Next month in April, another Teochew insurrection occurred at Chachoengsao and the governor of Chachoengsao was killed. Phraklang then had his son Kham guarded Samut Sakhon and himself led another force to put down the Chinese rebellion in Chachoengsao with his another son Chuang. Phraklang met Bodindecha, who had been returning from Cambodia, again at Chachoengsao. After the rebellions had been over, they both returned to Bangkok.

With the demise of Chao Phraya Bodindecha in 1849, Phraklang became the most powerful political figure in court. Phraklang had played a great role in the ascension of King Mongkut. In 1851, King Mongkut bestowed Phraklang with the title of Somdet Chao Phraya Borom Maha Prayurawongse and became Mongkut's regent kingdom-wide along with his brother Phraya Sripipat (That Bunnag) who became Somdet Chao Phraya Borom Maha Phichaiyat and Mongkut's regent in Bangkok. Prayurawongse's honor was equal to that of a prince. Prayurawongse was granted the right to use the Solar-charioteer Seal To distinguish him from his brother, Prayurawongse was known colloquially as "Somdet Chao Phraya Ong Yai" ( "The Elder Somdet Chao Phraya") while his brother was called the "Somdet Chao Phraya Ong Noi" ( "The Younger Somdet Chao Phraya").

During the reign of King Mongkut, Prayurawongse officially held the post of both Samuha Kalahom and Kromma Tha. However, the de facto duties were already distributed to his sons. His son Chuang, who was made Chao Phraya Sri Suriyawongse (later Somdet Chao Phraya Sri Suriyawongse), was the deputy of Kalahom. His another son Kham was deputy of Kromma Tha (he was later made Chao Phraya Thipakornwongse) the Ministry of Trade. Prayurawongse was one of the plenipotentiaries during the negotiation of the Bowring Treaty in April 1855. Bowring had demanded free trade and to end the monopoly of Siamese royal court in Western trade. The Bowring Treaty was concluded and free trade was established.

A month after the Bowring Treaty, Prayurawongse died at his residence near Wat Prayurawongse in modern Thonburi District on 26 April 1855, aged 67. His funeral and cremation were held in the manner and ceremonies of royalty at Wat Prayurawongse in October 1855. His sons and descendants continued to dominate Siamese politics in the later part of nineteenth century.

Family and descendants 
Prayurawongse had many wives, in accordance to contemporary social practices. His main wife was Lady Chan who was a daughter of Phraya Pollathep Thongin. Princess Praphaiwadi (daughter of King Rama I and sister to King Rama II) had given two of her ladies-in-waitings Lady Rod and Lady Inyai to be Prayurawongse's wives. Queen Sri Suriyendra had given Lady Peung to be his wife. He had total of twenty-four wives and forty-four children. His notable sons included;
 Chuang Bunnag, born to Lady Chan, later became Somdet Chao Phraya Sri Suriyawongse (1808 - 1882). Succeeded his father as Samuha Kalahom in 1855. Became the Regent during the minority of King Chulalongkorn from 1868 to 1873. A major historical figure.
 Kham Bunnag, born to Lady Rod, later became Chao Phraya Thipakornwongse (1813 - 1870). Succeeded his father as the Minister of Trade (Kromma Tha) in 1855.
 Chum Bunnag, born to Lady Chan, later became Phraya Montri Suriyawongse (1820 - 1866). Leader of Siamese mission to London in 1857.
 Tuam Bunnag, born to Lady Peung, later became Chao Phraya Panuwongse (1830 - 1913). Succeeded his brother Thipakornwongse as the Minister of Kromma Tha in 1869. Became the first Minister of Foreign Affairs of Siam in 1875.
 Porn Bunnag, born to Lady In, later became Chao Phraya Bhasakornwongse (1849 - 1920). First Minister of Agriculture from 1892 to 1894. First Minister of Education from 1892 to 1902.

References

Chaophraya
Bunnag family
Thai people of Iranian descent
1788 births
1855 deaths
Ministers of Defence of Thailand
Samuhakalahom